The 2008–09 version of the Jordan FA Cup was the 29th edition to be played. It is the premier knockout tournament for football teams in Jordan.

Al-Faisaly (Amman) went into this edition as the winner from 2007–08 and the club with the most wins, 16.

The cup winner were guaranteed a place in the 2010 AFC Cup.

Round of 16

16 teams play home and away matches as Knock out stage.

|}

Quarter-finals

8 teams play home and away matches as Knock out stage.

|}

Semi-finals

4 teams play home and away matches as Knock out stage

|}

Final

2 teams play a one leg final.

Jordan FA Cup seasons
Jordan
Cup